Acta Zoologica is one of the world's leading zoological journals.

Acta Zoologica is also used in the title of the following scientific journals:

 Acta Zoologica Academiae Scientiarum Hungaricae
 Acta Zoologica Bulgarica
 Acta Zoologica Cracoviensia
 Acta Zoologica Fennica
 Acta Zoologica Lilloana
 Acta Zoologica Lituanica
 Acta Zoologica Mexicana
 Acta Zoologica Sinica
 Acta Zoologica Taiwanica
 Acta Zoologica Universitatis Comenianae